The 2014 Canada Open Grand Prix was the seventh grand prix gold and grand prix tournament of the 2014 BWF Grand Prix Gold and Grand Prix. The tournament was held in UBC Thunderbird Arena, Vancouver, British Columbia, Canada June 30 until July 5, 2014 and had a total purse of $50,000.

Players by nation

Men's singles

Seeds

  Chou Tien-chen (quarter-final)
  Eric Pang (first round)
  Wong Wing Ki (semi-final)
  Anand Pawar (third round)
  Wang Tzu-wei (first round)
  Pablo Abian (withdrew)
  Suppanyu Avihingsanon (withdrew)
  Misha Zilberman (third round)
  Osleni Guerrero (first round)
  Joachim Persson (second round)
  Arvind Bhat (first round)
  Sattawat Pongnairat (third round)
  Rasmus Fladberg (third round)
  Howard Shu (third round)
  Ng Ka Long (final)
  Scott Evans (second round)

Finals

Top half

Section 1

Section 2

Section 3

Section 4

Bottom half

Section 5

Section 6

Section 7

Section 8

Women's singles

Seeds

  Michelle Li (champion)
  Zhang Beiwen (semi-final)
  Beatriz Corrales (second round)
  Linda Zechiri (withdrew)
  Chloe Magee (first round)
  Karin Schnaase (quarter-final)
  Natalia Perminova (second round)
  Sabrina Jaquet (first round)

Finals

Top half

Section 1

Section 2

Bottom half

Section 3

Section 4

Men's doubles

Seeds

  Robin Middleton / Ross Smith (withdrew)
  Phillip Chew / Sattawat Pongnairat (quarter-final)
  Adrian Liu / Derrick Ng (quarter-final)
  Laurent Constantin / Matthieu Lo Ying Ping (quarter-final)
  Liang Jui-wei / Lu Chia-bin (champion)
  Liao Min-chun / Tseng Min-hao (final)
  Max Schwenger / Josche Zurwonne (semi-final)
  Phillipe Charron / Toby Ng (first round)

Finals

Top half

Section 1

Section 2

Bottom half

Section 3

Section 4

Women's doubles

Seeds

  Eva Lee / Paula Lynn Obanana (second round)
  Tang Hetian / Renuga Veeran (withdrew)
  Samantha Barning / Iris Tabeling (quarter-final)
  Alex Bruce / Phyllis Chan (second round)

Finals

Top half

Section 1

Section 2

Bottom half

Section 3

Section 4

Mixed doubles

Seeds

  Jorrit de Ruiter / Samantha Barning (final)
  Max Schwenger / Carla Nelte (champion)
  Phillip Chew / Jamie Subandhi (second round)
  Sam Magee / Chloe Magee (semi-final)

Finals

Top half

Section 1

Section 2

Bottom half

Section 3

Section 4

References

Canadian Open (badminton)
Canada Open Grand Prix
Canada Open Grand Prix
Canada Open Grand Prix
Canada Open Grand Prix
Sport in Vancouver
BWF Grand Prix Gold and Grand Prix